Gordonians RFC are a rugby union team based in Aberdeen, Scotland founded in 1923. They take their name from the fact that they were originally the former pupils club for Robert Gordon's College in the city.

History

Founded, in 1904–05 for the former pupils of Robert Gordon's College, the Gordonian Rugby Football Club has seen many changes in its constitution and fortunes over the last 101 years. The first fifty years of the Gordonian rugby had seen the establishment of a solid and vibrant club, the next fifty one years were to see the club experience many highs and lows as the game was restructured at a national level. First international recognition came to the club when Bert Bruce took the field for Scotland against Australia at Murrayfield in 1946–47. The international torch was carried through the rest of the century by players like Donald MacDonald, Ron Glasgow and Ian McCrae.

Throughout the late 1950s and the 1960s the club constantly improved its fixture list and played an active role in the development of the game in the North East of Scotland with many players representing the district with Ian McRae, Gordon Hill, A Whyte, and Ian Spence going on to become Scottish trialists. Ian McCrae a fantastically energetic and skilled scrum-half won six Scottish International caps between 1967 and 1972 and like Gordon Hill (1961) and Ian Spence (1963–64) also enjoyed the honour of playing for the Barbarians in 1965. The solid player base and management structure of the 1960s took the club into the 1970s in a strong position.

Having established themselves as a force in the 1960s, Gordonians were to see many changes in the 1970s with the introduction of National Leagues in season 1973–74, the club going "open" in 1974–75 and being able to welcome many new talented and committed players. The club would see the gradual introduction of a more professional and committed approach to training and the beginning of the occasional end of season tours for the various teams to the North East of England, the West Coast of Scotland or even France in the 80's and South Africa in the 90's.

Gordonians started life in Division III of the new National League system in season 1973–74 and immediately won promotion to Division II. However, the climb from Division II to I took a further five years to achieve but in the interim the club had been fortunate to retain a consistent pool of players, the 2nd and 3rd fifteens established themselves at the head of the Midland League and Aberdeen District League respectively. In season 1978–79 seven Gordonians played for the North Midlands side versus a touring New Zealand side and Chris Snape played for the Barbarians proving the club had the player base necessary to compete at the highest level. Promotion to Division I was achieved in season 1979–80.

Season 1980–81 was to prove one of the club's most successful and enjoyable. The long-awaited arrival of Hawick at Seafield for the club's first ever Division I match was greeted by a brilliantly sunny day and a nervous crowd of around fifteen hundred. There was no need for nerves as Gordonians roared into an early lead and finished the match comfortable winners 26–13. After the first eight matches in Division I stood third in the table finally finishing the season in a very creditable sixth place. The success had been achieved by a "club" effort and to mark this achievement the club took a touring party of 38 players to Whitely Bay for a three match tour for 1st and 3rd XV's.

The season 1981–82 by contrast, saw the club unable to continue its successful run. Injuries to key players and a side that was getting a bit long in the tooth all contributed to a poor season with the side ending 2nd bottom of the league. But for league reconstruction Gordonians would have been demoted but another season of Division I, was assured. Season 1982–83 proved a very difficult season for the club, with a lot of young and inexperienced players being fielded to fill the gaps and relegation could not be avoided. Season 1983–84 was therefore a season of consolidation finishing 6th in Div II. The 3rd XV also won the Aberdeen and District League.

When they were in the Scottish Premier League, in the 1982–83 season, they had to play a number of matches against Borders sides, a round trip of about 300 miles. This distance appears to have taken its toll. For example, in that season, they were defeated by Hawick RFC, 102–4, and a week later, by Gala RFC, some 112–4. However, this was not completely unusual – Nairn McEwan's Highland RFC, for example, took long journeys in the 1970s.

Consolidation was short lived with the club finishing bottom of Div II in 1984–85. However, the much-celebrated club tour to France, in which all three fixtures against very strong French opposition were won, was a great boost to club morale.

Season 1985–86, captained by Doug Lowson, saw a season of consolidation in Division III, with the club finishing 6th.

Seasons 1986–87 and 1987–88 saw slips to the lower half of Division III after indifferent league campaigns but at least the slide appeared to have stopped. Indeed, the downward trend was firmly reversed in Season 1988–89 when Colin Manders’ side was promoted to Division II with a great run of victories in the second half of the season.

The reverse in fortunes however, was short lived and the club was relegated the following season and finished 9th in Div III, the season after that (1990–91). One highlight was that of Seb Whyte represented the club at Scotland under 18 level and Lachie Dow represented Scotland at Under 21 level.

The team disappeared for a while, but has now been re-established.

The Gordonians 1st XV currently play in Scottish National League Division Three having won the Caledonia Regional League 1 title in the 2016/17 season

Their 2nd XV, nicknamed the "Jolly Boys", won the Aberdeen and District League  and the Gyrodata Aberdeen and District Referees Cup  in the 2010–11 Season.

Honours

 Aberdeenshire Sevens
 Champions (1): 1994
 Aberdeen Sevens
 Champions (1): 1960
 Deeside Sevens
 Champions (1): 2016
 North of Scotland District Sevens
 Champions (2): 1938, 1960
 Aberdeen and District League Sevens
 Champions (1): 1998
 Mackie Academy F.P. Sevens
 Champions (1): 1978
 Highland Sevens
 Champions (4): 1961, 1962, 1965, 1992
 Dundee HSFP Sevens
 Champions (5): 1963, 1964, 1965, 1966, 1973
 Ross Sutherland Sevens
 Champions (4): 1958, 1960, 1964, 1959
 Garioch Sevens
 Champions (1): 1987
 Moray Sevens
 Champions (11): 1936, 1938, 1954, 1960, 1961, 1962, 1965, 1970, 1978, 1979, 1998
 Caledonia Sevens
 Champions: 2022

Notable players
 Robert M Bruce
 JF McCrae
 Andrew McInnes
 Ron Glasgow.
 Andrew "Keg" O'Neill
 Murray Kenneth Fraser 
 Scott Kennedy

References

Sources

 Cotton, Fran (Ed.) (1984) The Book of Rugby Disasters & Bizarre Records. Compiled by Chris Rhys. London. Century Publishing. 
 Massie, Allan A Portrait of Scottish Rugby (Polygon, Edinburgh)

Scottish rugby union teams
Rugby union in Aberdeen
Sports teams in Aberdeen
People educated at Robert Gordon's College
1905 establishments in Scotland
Rugby clubs established in 1905